Trebišov Aloud is a local political party in Slovakia, active mostly in the city of Trebišov. Marián Kolesár is the founder and the leader of the party

History 
The party was preceded by a non-governmental organisation of the same name, established in 2007, with the aim of stopping the planned construction of a coal electric power plant in the city of Trebišov.

Electoral results

Municipal Assembly of Trebišov

Municipal Assembly of Trebišov

References 

Political parties in Slovakia
Localism (politics)